Natalia Navarro Galvis (born August 12, 1987 in Barranquilla) is a Colombian beauty pageant titleholder who was crowned Señorita Colombia 2009 and placed in the Top 15 at Miss Universe 2010.

Early life
Born in Barranquilla to parents Fuad Navarro and María Cecilia Galvis, Navarro is pursuing a bachelor's degree in  finance at Florida International University in Miami and speaks English, Spanish and some French.

Señorita Colombia 2009

During the competition, Navarro placed first in swimsuit and evening gown, which allowed her to advance as one of the Top 5 finalists,  eventually winning the national crown and the right to represent Colombia in Miss Universe 2010.

Miss Universe 2010
As the official representative of her country to the 2010 Miss Universe pageant broadcast live from Las Vegas, Nevada on August 23, 2010, Navarro became one of the Top 15 semifinalists and the only South American contestant in the final, placing 12th overall.

References

External links
Official Señorita Colombia website

1987 births
Living people
Miss Colombia winners
Miss Universe 2010 contestants
Colombian beauty pageant winners
People from Barranquilla
Florida International University people